Nathaniel Sneyd (c. 1767 – 31 July 1833) was an Irish politician, landowner and businessman

He was a Member of the Parliament of Ireland representing the Carrick constituency from 1794 to 1800 and was High Sheriff of Cavan in 1795.

He briefly represented the Cavan County Parliament of Ireland constituency which was succeeded after the Union with Great Britain in 1800 by the Cavan Westminster constituency, which he represented from 1801 until 1826. In general election of 1806 he contested two constituencies for Parliament, winning both and choosing to represent Cavan over Enniskillen.

In Cavan, Sneyd lived in Ballyconnell and owned plantation lands around Bawnboy. From 1800, he was president of the Bawnboy Farming Society, the first founded in County Cavan. In 1801 he was appointed Custos Rotulorum of Cavan.

On 29 July 1833, in Westmoreland Street, Dublin, Nathaniel Sneyd was shot in the head by a madman, John Mason, who had a grudge against the firm of wine merchants Sneyd, French and Barton, where Sneyd was senior partner. Sneyd died of his wounds two days later. He had two memorials, one in Cavan and a life-size neo-classical recumbent effigy in the crypt of Christ Church Cathedral, Dublin. The sculptor Thomas Kirk represented Sneyd lying dead with a female figure weeping over him.

Family

Sneyd was married to Alice Montgomery, the daughter of George Leslie Montgomery MP, of Ballyconnell, County Cavan.

References

1833 deaths
Politicians from County Cavan
High Sheriffs of Cavan
Irish MPs 1790–1797
Irish MPs 1798–1800
UK MPs 1801–1802
UK MPs 1802–1806
UK MPs 1806–1807
UK MPs 1807–1812
UK MPs 1812–1818
UK MPs 1818–1820
UK MPs 1820–1826
Year of birth uncertain
Members of the Parliament of Ireland (pre-1801) for County Leitrim constituencies
Members of the Parliament of Ireland (pre-1801) for County Cavan constituencies
Members of the Parliament of the United Kingdom for County Cavan constituencies (1801–1922)
Members of the Parliament of the United Kingdom for County Fermanagh constituencies (1801–1922)